Donald Richard Bryant (1948 – 5 December 2019), generally known as Rick Bryant, was a New Zealand blues and rock singer/songwriter.

Bands include Rick Bryant and the Jive Bombers, The Jubilation Gospel Choir, and Windy City Strugglers. With over a fifty-year history in music other bands include Mammal and Bruno Lawrence's Blerta. 

He was convicted of possession  of cannabis, cannabis oil, ecstasy and cocaine, but appealed his sentence in 2011, blaming his 35-year history of cannabis use.

Bryant died in Auckland on 5 December 2019.

References

External links
 NZ Music Commissision entry
 Website
 

1948 births
2019 deaths
20th-century New Zealand male singers
New Zealand male singer-songwriters
Musicians from Auckland
Academic staff of the Victoria University of Wellington
People from Wellington City